The Bayer Insectarium is an insectarium located within the Saint Louis Zoo in St. Louis, Missouri, United States. Having opened in 2000 and designed by David Mason & Associates with a cost of $4 million, this  facility houses educational exhibits and an active breeding and research facility. It also includes a window to the exhibits area and two-way communications so visitors may watch entomologists work and ask them questions. The facility even includes a geodesic flight dome cage, which is home to numerous rainforest flowers and butterfly species.

The Bayer Insectarium is open every day except Christmas and New Years days. Admission to the zoo and the insectarium is free.

Butterfly collection
The insectarium includes a tropical garden and pollinarium. The gallery (below) illustrates a few specimens from the pollinarium's collection.

Notes

External links

Insectariums
Saint Louis Zoo
Buildings and structures in St. Louis
Tourist attractions in St. Louis
Butterfly houses
Monsanto
2000 establishments in Missouri
Zoos in Missouri